The 1932 Washington University Bears football team was an American football team that represented Washington University in St. Louis as a member of the Missouri Valley Conference (MVC) during the 1932 college football season. In its first season under head coach Jimmy Conzelman, the team compiled a 4–4 record (1–2 against conference opponents), finished fourth in the MVC, and was outscored by a total of 92 to 80. The team played its home games at Francis Field in St. Louis.

Schedule

References

Washington University
Washington University Bears football seasons
Washington University Bears football